La Democracia, Guatemala may refer to:

The municipality of La Democracia, Escuintla
The municipality of La Democracia, Huehuetenango